Ademo may refer to:

Euphorbia, a genus of spurges 
Ademo, a French rapper with PNL
Ademo Freedman, founder of activist group Cop Block